The WT Peterson Community Oval, best known as the Brunswick Street Oval and also as the Fitzroy Cricket Ground, is a cricket and Australian rules football ground located in Edinburgh Gardens in Fitzroy North, Victoria.

History

Australian Rules Football
The ground was the home of Fitzroy Football Club in the Victorian Football Association from 1884 to 1896, and in the Victorian Football League from 1897 until 1966, with the last game being played there on Saturday 20 August 1966 against , a game which the Lions lost by 84 points. The Fitzroy Football Club then moved its home games to Princes Park sharing the ground with Carlton Football Club between 1967 and 1969, while keeping their training and administrative base at the Brunswick Street Oval, before moving its home games and their training and administrative base to the Junction Oval in St Kilda from 1970. 747 matches at the top level of Victorian senior football - 135 in the VFA and 612 in the VFL - were played at the ground over 83 seasons of competition.

The ground was also used for Australian rules football during the late 1970s and 1980s by the Fitzroy Rovers football club in the Western Suburban Football League, before it began to be used by the University Reds football club in the Victorian Amateur Football Association in 1991. In 1996, the Fitzroy Football Club merged with the Brisbane Bears, and the remaining Victorian members of the club began to be based at the Brunswick Street Oval, eventually merging with the University Reds to form the Fitzroy Reds Football Club, which is now based at the oval. The main grandstand is listed on the Victorian Heritage Register.

Cricket
The venue's original tenants, the Fitzroy Cricket Club used the venue as its primary home ground from 1872 until it left the venue in 1986, when they merged with the Doncaster Cricket Club.  The venue hosted one first-class cricket match, between Victoria and Western Australia in 1925/26. The venue however remains home ground of The Edinburgh Cricket Club which was established in 1978 and is one of the largest cricket clubs in Victoria with 40 junior sides ranging from Under 10 to Under 18

Soccer
During the 1975 and 1976 Victorian State League seasons, the venue was used by the soccer club Heidelberg United (then known as Fitzroy United Alexander), as well as one fixture in the National Soccer League. In the 1980s the venue was used intermittently by several lower-league soccer clubs up until 1990. The venue had previously hosted several showpiece soccer matches in the 1910s and 1920s, including Dockerty Cup finals, the annual local 'internationals' as well as genuine international matches.

Records
VFA games: 135 between 1883 and 1896, including 122 which Fitzroy played in.
VFL games: 612 between 1897 and 1966, including 609 which Fitzroy played in.
VFL finals games: 4

References

 Austadiums

Defunct Australian Football League grounds
Defunct Australian rules football grounds
Heritage-listed buildings in Melbourne
Cricket grounds in Victoria (Australia)
Soccer venues in Melbourne
Sports venues completed in 1883
Fitzroy, Victoria
Sport in the City of Yarra
Buildings and structures in the City of Yarra